Shahanshah (also Romanized as Shahanshāh, Shāhinshāh, and Shahshanāh; also known as Qaryeh-ye Shahanshāh and Gūsheh) is a village in Koregah-e Gharbi Rural District, in the Central District of Khorramabad County, Lorestan Province, Iran. At the 2006 census, its population was 449, in 88 families.

References 

Towns and villages in Khorramabad County